Pyrgus sidae, the yellow-banded skipper, is a species of skipper (family Hesperiidae). It is found in from the Iberian Peninsula (only an isolated occurrence in the Sierra de Gredos) through southern and eastern Europe , southeast France, the northwestern coastal areas of central Italy, then Istria (Slovenia and Croatia) and the Balkan peninsula, across Turkey, Transcaucasia, to Iran and Afghanistan. East of the Southern Ural mountains the range extends to northwest Kazakhstan and the west of the Tien Shan in the north.

Pyrgus species are usually difficult to separate in the field but P. sidae is a notable exception. It is the largest member of the genus found in Europe with a wingspan of 32–38 mm and can be instantly recognized by two bold black-edged yellow bands on the underside of the hindwings. The dark brown upper forewings are also boldly marked with numerous large white spots. The adults fly in June and July.

The larval food plant is Abutilon avicennae.

References

Whalley, Paul - Mitchell Beazley Guide to Butterflies (1981, reprinted 1992)

External links
European Butterflies
Fauna Europaea
Lepiforum.de
Butterfly Conservation Armenia

Pyrgus
Butterflies described in 1784
Butterflies of Europe